Oberea ressli is a species of beetle in the family Cerambycidae. It was described by Demelt in 1963. It is known from Turkey.

References

Beetles described in 1963
ressli